Sabrina Ward Harrison (born 1975, Canada) is a Canadian artist and author.

She is the creator of five published books of her journals, the first one being published when she was 23, Spilling Open; The Art of Becoming Yourself (Villard 1999). The True And the Questions; a journal (Chronicle Books 2005) is based on the teaching of "The Art of Becoming Yourself", a course she created in 1996.

She currently lives in Madison, Wisconsin and hosts a podcast called Room in the Trees..

Works
Spilling Open: The Art of Becoming Yourself, New World Library 1994, 
Brave on the Rocks: If You Don't Go, You Don't See, Topeka Bindery 2001, 
Messy Thrilling Life: The Art of Figuring Out How to Live, Villard 2004, 
The True and the Questions: A Journal, Chronicle Books 2005, 
And the Story Is Happening, Chronicle Books 2012,

References

External links

 
 Profile and Interview on www.randomhouse.com

Canadian expatriate writers in the United States
1975 births
Living people
Canadian self-help writers
Canadian women podcasters